Dar Agah (also Romanized as Dar Āgāh, Derāgāh, and Dorāgāh; also known as Dūrāhgāh) is a village in Dar Agah Rural District, in the Central District of Hajjiabad County, Hormozgan Province, Iran. At the 2006 census, its population was 188, in 57 families.

References 

Populated places in Hajjiabad County